Jose Moreno Brooks is an American actor best known for playing Gael Garnica on the NBC comedy Telenovela.

Early life
Growing up in San Jose, California, Brooks attended Bellarmine College Preparatory. He graduated from University of California, Los Angeles with a degree in Economics and Philosophy, but decided to pursue modeling and acting. He also played semi-pro soccer. His mother is of Mexican descent and his father has Irish and English ancestry.

Career
Brooks starred in MTV's One Bad Choice as Stephan Perez in the re-telling of his true-life story. His other credits include guest roles on The Nine Lives of Chloe King, The Game and Big Time Rush. In February 2015, Brooks was cast as Gael Garnica in the NBC comedy Telenovela.

Personal life

On February 14, 2021, Brooks revealed on Instagram that he was engaged to Senior Vice President of Business Affairs at NBCUniversal Media, Erica Silverstein.

Filmography

References

External links
 

21st-century American male actors
American male television actors
Living people
Male actors from California
Male actors from San Jose, California
American male actors of Mexican descent
1985 births